Corino is a surname.  Notable people with this name include:

Allison Corino (born 1977), Canadian professional wrestler known as Allison Danger
Colby Corino (born 1996), American/Canadian professional wrestler
Dustin Corino, professional wrestler known as Desirable Dustin
Justin Corino, professional wrestler known as Gigolo Justin
Sergio Corino (born 1974), Spanish footballer
Steve Corino (born 1973), Canadian professional wrestler
Corino Andrade (1906-2005), Portuguese neurologist